Dysart and Ruan is a Catholic parish in County Clare, Ireland. It covers the civil parishes of Ruan  and Dysert, and includes the village of Ruan, which holds the parish office. The parish contains the ruins of the 12th century St. Tola's Church, part of Dysert O'Dea Monastery.

Location
The parish lies to the north of Ennis on the road to Corofin. The River Fergus runs through most of the parish, through Tedane and other lakes, to Clarecastle. In 1837 there were police stations in Dysert and Ruan, and chapels in each place. 
The chapel in Ruan had been rebuilt by public subscription in 1834.
The parish includes the civil parishes of Ruan and Dysert.
Dysert is sometimes called Dysert O'Dea, since it was part of the territory of the O'Dea sept.
Ruan is near the Burren and between Corofin, Crusheen and Ennis.
The name "Ruan" (An Ruadhán) is an old Irish term for the alder tree, at one time used to make red dye.

Antiquities

Dysert O'Dea Church

The ruined Church of Disert consists of a nave  and a choir . 
It was described by Eugene Curry in 1839.
The west gable has a window, completely covered in ivy inside and out.
The door has four circular arches, one over the other, resting on columns at the sides of the door. The columns are surmounted by human heads. The largest arch has nineteen stones that project a small way from the wall. They are carved with twelve human and seven animal heads.

The gable had a double-headed curvilinear pointed belfry. There were pointed windows in the north wall of nave and in the south side of quire near the east gable.
According to tradition the choir was added to the Church by O'Dea.

White Cross of Tola

About a mile east of the Church of Disert there is a deserted burying ground, near the old chapel, called Mainistir-na-Sratha-Duibhe (Monastery of the Black Sward). 
There is a Holy Well near it called Tobar Oireachta at which Stations were still performed in 1839.
Nearby to the north is a small elevated spot called Cnocan-na-Croise (Height of the Cross), on which a Celtic cross was erected.
The ancient cross lay on the ground.

The cross was re-erected in 1871 by Francis Hutcheson Synge of Dysert.
The north and south sides of the cross are cut into patterns. The north side includes a crude carving of two men swearing on a staff between another man and a bishop. The west side has two heads, but otherwise the carvings have been broken off. The east side has a figure of Christ, with outstretched arms. Below that is a large figure of Saint Tola of Clonard, the Bishop of Clonard and the founder and patron of the Dysert church. Tola died between 733 and 737.

Ruan Church 
The ruined Church of Ruan stands in the Ruan townland of the Ruan civil parish.
As of 1839 the walls stood at their original height apart from the west gable, the top of which is broken off. 
There was a pointed doorway in the south side near the west gable, and a square one in the same side near the east gable. There is a double pointed window in the east gable, but its mullion is gone. There is a portion of the north wall elevated six feet above the rest, as if for the purpose of a ball-alley. There is a little Chapel projecting to the south from the south west angle, nineteen feet six inches long and sixteen feet three inches broad having a pointed door in its east side and elevated tomb in its north end, with a monumental stone over it in the Church wall, exhibiting the following inscription: "This Chapel and tomb were erected by Donogh O’Kerine, the son of Dermot O’Kerine of Owan, for him and his posterities’ use in the year of our Lord God, 1688."
There is no patron saint associated with this church, and no holy well dedicated to any particular saint nearby. 
The only holy wells in the area were named after the townlands.

Today
Dysart and Ruan is a parish in the Roman Catholic Diocese of Killaloe.
The parish office is in the village of Ruan.
The parish churches are St Mary's in Ruan and St Tola in Dysart.
The parish runs two primary schools, Ruan National School and Toonagh National School.
The parish is home to the Ruan GAA, a Gaelic Athletic Association club, which fields teams in Hurling and Camogie competitions.

The church of St. Marys in Ruan was built in 1912. It replaced the 1834 church. 
The stained glass windows behind the altar that were made by Franz Mayer & Co. of Munich, Germany.
They were formerly in the chapel of St. Xaviers Convent of Mercy in Ennis, and were moved to Ruan in the 1990s when the convent was closed. 
The window on the left shows the Nativity. That in the center is the Sacred Heart, and includes sheaves of wheat, grapes and a chalice, symbols of the consecration. 
The window on the right depicts life in the house of the Holy Family. Mary is working on the loom and Joseph is working on carpentry with Jesus by his side.

Gallery

References

Sources

Parishes of the Roman Catholic Diocese of Killaloe